Alexandra Essoe (born March 9, 1992) is a Canadian actress who has appeared predominantly in horror films. Essoe had her first lead role in the 2014 American horror film Starry Eyes, and she had a starring role in the 2017 American horror film Midnighters. She has collaborated several times with director Mike Flanagan, playing Wendy Torrance in the 2019 horror film Doctor Sleep and playing supporting roles in the series The Haunting of Bly Manor in 2020 and Midnight Mass in 2021.

Career
Essoe's parents were Canadian and American immigrants living in Saudi Arabia when Essoe was born. When she was 12 years old, she and her family moved to Toronto. Essoe's mother was a stage actor, and Essoe watched rehearsals and productions. While she acted in high school, including playing the lead in Medea, she initially aspired to be a teacher. After a couple of years modeling, she took an acting workshop in Toronto, which led her to an acting school in Vancouver, and later, a school in Los Angeles. Prior to starring in Starry Eyes, she appeared in the TV series Reaper and various short films.

Filmography

References

External links

Living people
Canadian film actresses
1992 births